The 2021–22 Rice Owls women's basketball team represents Rice University during the 2021–22 NCAA Division I women's basketball season. The team is led by first-year head coach Lindsay Edmonds, and plays their home games at the Tudor Fieldhouse in Houston, Texas as a member of Conference USA.

Schedule and results

|-
!colspan=12 style=|Non-conference regular season

|-
!colspan=12 style=|CUSA regular season

|-
!colspan=9 style=| Conference USA Tournament

Notes

See also
 2021–22 Rice Owls men's basketball team

References

Rice Owls women's basketball seasons
Rice
Rice Owls women's basketball
Rice Owls women's basketball